Yin, Qing is a Chinese composer. His folk-music based opera The Ballad of Canal (2012) was the first modern opera based on folk music themes produced by the NCPA.

References

People's Republic of China composers
Living people
Chinese male classical composers
Chinese classical composers
Chinese opera composers
Male opera composers
Year of birth missing (living people)